The discography of the South African rock band The Parlotones consists of eight studio albums, four live albums, two compilation albums, and four extended plays (EPs). The band consists of Kahn Morbee (lead vocals and rhythm guitar), Paul Hodgson (lead guitar), Glen Hodgson (bass guitar, keyboards and backing vocals), and Neil Pauw (drums and percussion).

The band's third studio album, A World Next Door to Yours, has sold more copies in South Africa than Oasis, Coldplay and The Killers combined.

Albums

Studio albums

| "—" denotes releases that did not chart.

Live albums

Compilation albums

Extended plays

Singles

Videography

Theatrically released films

Videos

Music videos

References

The Parlotones albums
Alternative rock discographies